Reuben Kiplagat Chesire (27 March 1941 - 22 November 2008) was a Kenyan politician who served as a member of parliament from 1988 to 1997.

Chesire was born on 27 March 1941 in Kabarnet, Baringo County, the son of Isaiah Chemwetich Chesire and Elizabeth Kobilo Chesire. He attended Kapropita Primary School and in 1960 the Royal Technical College Nairobi Kenya, leaving in 1962 after successfully passing his A-levels. He was appointed as the District Officer in Kwale later that year. In 1972 Chesire was elected the first African Chairman of the Kenya Farmers Association. Between 1973 and 1981 he served as the chairman of the African Tours and Hotels, which was listed on the Nairobi Securities Exchange.

In the 1988 Kenyan general election he was elected as the member of parliament for Eldoret North Constituency, located in the former Uasin Gishu County, representing the Kenya African National Union. He was subsequently re-elected at the 1992 Kenyan general elections. He lost his seat to the current president William Samoei Ruto in the general elections held in December 1997. He unsuccessfully challenged Ruto for the Eldoret North Constituency at the 2002 Kenyan general elections.

References

1941 births
2008 deaths
Kenyan politicians
Kenya African National Union politicians
Members of the National Assembly (Kenya)
University of Nairobi alumni